Gideon Victor Way (born May 7, 1984) is an Indonesian footballer who plays as a midfielder for Persiba Balikpapan in the Indonesia Soccer Championship. He previously play for Persiram Raja Ampat.

Club statistics

References

External links

1984 births
Association football midfielders
Living people
Indonesian footballers
Papuan sportspeople
Liga 1 (Indonesia) players
Persiram Raja Ampat players
Indonesian Premier Division players